Antonín Pospíšil (10 June 1903, Mouřínov – 15 June 1973, Prague) was a Czechoslovak politician of the Catholic Czechoslovakian People's Party during the Communist Party's rule, when other legal parties had to play the role of CP satellites. From 1949 to 1952 Pospíšil was the general secretary of the People's Party and from 1968 to 1973 the chairman of the party as successor of the priest Josef Plojhar. From 1951 to 1957 Pospíšil was the minister of transport and electricity. He was later minister without portfolio.

See also
Christian and Democratic Union – Czechoslovak People's Party

1903 births
1973 deaths
People from Vyškov District
People from the Margraviate of Moravia
Leaders of KDU-ČSL
Government ministers of Czechoslovakia
Members of the National Assembly of Czechoslovakia (1948–1954)
Members of the National Assembly of Czechoslovakia (1954–1960)
Members of the National Assembly of Czechoslovakia (1960–1964)
Members of the National Assembly of Czechoslovakia (1964–1968)
Members of the Chamber of the People of Czechoslovakia (1969–1971)
Members of the Chamber of the People of Czechoslovakia (1971–1976)